XXV is the fifteenth album released by British pop group The Shadows. It was released in 1983 on Polydor Records. It includes instrumental cover versions of songs by Toto, Mark Knopfler, Joe Cocker & Jennifer Warnes, Dusty Springfield, Jet Harris & Tony Meehan, Elaine Paige, Juice Newton and Procol Harum. XXV carries the distinction of being one of very few Shadows albums to feature some vocal tracks, "The Modern Way" and "Liverpool Days" (both sung by Hank Marvin).

Track listing

Charts

Personnel
 Hank Marvin — Guitar & Lead Vocals        
 Bruce Welch — Guitar & Backing Vocals        
 Brian Bennett — Drums & Percussion 
 Alan Jones — Bass Guitar
 Cliff Hall — Keyboards

Additional musicians
Harry Bogdanvos
Tony Catchpole
Alan Hawkshaw
Tony Rivers — Vocals

Recorded at
Honeyhill Studios
Nivram Studios
Herts by Dick Plant

References

The Shadows albums
Polydor Records albums
1983 albums